The Roman Catholic Church in Guinea-Bissau is composed of 2 dioceses.

List of dioceses

Episcopal Conference of Guinea-Bissau

Immediately Subject to the Holy See 
Diocese of Bafatá
Diocese of Bissau

External links 
Catholic-Hierarchy entry.
GCatholic.org.

Guinea-Bissau
Catholic dioceses